Sergeant Charles E. Brown (December 11, 1841 – February 20, 1919) was an American soldier who fought in the American Civil War. Brown received the country's highest award for bravery during combat, the Medal of Honor, for his action during the Battle of Globe Tavern on 19 August 1864. He was honored with the award on 1 December 1864.

Biography
Brown was born in Schuylkill County, Pennsylvania on 11 December 1841. He enlisted into the 50th Pennsylvania Infantry on 9 September 1861. While in that battalion he was promoted to Sergeant and went on to earn the Medal of Honor for capturing the battle flag of the 47th Virginia Infantry during the Battle of Globe Tavern on 19 August 1864. He was subsequently promoted to 1st Lieutenant and then captain in command of his company, having fought throughout the war. He mustered out of service on 30 July 1865. The flag he captured is on display at the Museum of the Confederacy in Richmond, Virginia.

Medal of Honor citation

See also

List of American Civil War Medal of Honor recipients: A–F

References

1841 births
1919 deaths
People of Pennsylvania in the American Civil War
Union Army officers
United States Army Medal of Honor recipients
American Civil War recipients of the Medal of Honor
People from Schuylkill County, Pennsylvania